This is the October–December part of the 2010 ITF Women's Circuit.

Key

October

November

December

See also 
 2010 ITF Women's Circuit
 2010 ITF Women's Circuit (January–March)
 2010 ITF Women's Circuit (April–June)
 2010 ITF Women's Circuit (July–September)
 2010 WTA Tour

 10-12